Astegania is a genus of moths in the family Geometridae.

Species
 Astegania honesta (Prout, 1908)

References
 Astegania at Markku Savela's Lepidoptera and Some Other Life Forms

Caberini
Geometridae genera